Dernancourt is a commune in the Somme department in Hauts-de-France in northern France.

Geography

Population

Places and monuments
The commune was considerably affected by World War I. The First and Second Battles of Dernancourt were fought there. 127 Commonwealth soldiers are buried in the Dernancourt Communal Cemetery and 2167 are buried in the Dernancourt Communal Cemetery Extension.

See also
Communes of the Somme department

References

External links

 The Commonwealth cemetery
 South Africans buried in Dernancourt Communal Cemetery Extension

Communes of Somme (department)